Farewell Fondle 'Em is a compilation album that marked the ending of Fondle 'Em Records. It was released on Definitive Jux on October 30, 2001.

Critical reception

Nathan Rabin of The A.V. Club viewed Farewell Fondle 'Em as an "homage to Bobbito's low-budget, overachieving indie". Matt Cibula of PopMatters wrote, "The music on Farewell Fondle 'Em was never going to set the commercial world on fire -- it's too weird, too edgy, too much fun to listen to."

In 2015, Fact placed the album at number 66 on its "100 Best Indie Hip-Hop Records of All Time" list.

Track listing

References

External links
 

2001 compilation albums
Definitive Jux compilation albums
Albums produced by El-P
Albums produced by MF Doom
Record label compilation albums
East Coast hip hop compilation albums